The  Keeskogel, a mountain with a height of , lies in the Venediger Group of the High Tauern in Austria. The summit is located about 4 km as the crow flies northwest of the Großvenediger. The waymarked, glacier-free normal route from the Kürsinger Hut, is a relatively straightforward climb in dry and snow-free condition and takes about 1½ to 2 hours to reach the summit (sure-footedness required). Especially impressive in good weather is the view from the summit of the north side of the Großvenediger and the main chain of the Tauern and the glaciated landscape of the Obersulzbachkees and Untersulzbachkees.

Literature and maps 

Willi End/Hubert Peterka: Alpine Club Guide: Venedigergruppe; Bergverlag Rudolf Rother, 5th edn., Munich, 2006; 
 Alpine Club map, Sheet 36, 1:25,000 series, Venedigergruppe, 

Alpine three-thousanders
Mountains of the Alps
Mountains of Salzburg (state)
Venediger Group